Time After Time is a 1986 album by Oscar Peterson.

Track listing
 "Cool Walk" (Oscar Peterson) – 8:21
 "Love Ballade" (Peterson) – 9:35
 "Soft Winds" (Benny Goodman, Fletcher Henderson) – 6:48
 Medley: "Who Can I Turn To?"/"Without a Song"/"Time After Time" (Leslie Bricusse, Anthony Newley)/(Edward Eliscu, Billy Rose, Vincent Youmans)/(Jule Styne, Sammy Cahn) – 14:22
 "On the Trail" (Harold Adamson, Ferde Grofé) – 6:48

Personnel
 Oscar Peterson – piano
 Joe Pass – guitar
 David Young – double bass
 Martin Drew – drums

References

1986 albums
Oscar Peterson albums
Albums produced by Norman Granz
Pablo Records albums